The Satires are a collection of satirical poems by the Latin author Juvenal written between the end of the first and the early second centuries A.D.

Juvenal is credited with sixteen known poems divided among five books; all are in the Roman genre of satire, which, at its most basic in the time of the author, comprised a wide-ranging discussion of society and social  in dactylic hexameter. The sixth and tenth satires are some of the most renowned works in the collection. The poems are not individually titled, but translators have often added titles for the convenience of readers. 

Book I: Satires 1–5
Book II: Satire 6
Book III: Satires 7–9
Book IV: Satires 10–12
Book V: Satires 13–16 (Satire 16 is incompletely preserved)

Roman  was a formal literary genre rather than being simply clever, humorous critique in no particular format. Juvenal wrote in this tradition, which originated with Lucilius and included the Sermones of Horace and the Satires of Persius. In a tone and manner ranging from irony to apparent rage, Juvenal criticizes the actions and beliefs of many of his contemporaries, providing insight more into value systems and questions of morality and less into the realities of Roman life. The author employs outright obscenity less frequently than Martial or Catullus, but the scenes painted in his text are no less vivid or lurid for that discretion.

The author makes constant allusion to history and myth as a source of object lessons or exemplars of particular vices and virtues. Coupled with his dense and elliptical Latin, these tangential references indicate that the intended reader of the Satires was highly educated. The Satires are concerned with perceived threats to the social continuity of the Roman citizens: social-climbing foreigners, unfaithfulness, and other more extreme excesses of their own class. The intended audience of the Satires constituted a subset of the Roman elite, primarily adult males of a more conservative social stance.

Scholarly estimates for the dating of the individual books have varied. It is generally accepted that the fifth book must date to a point after 127, because of a reference to the Roman consul Lucius Aemilius Juncus in Satire 15. A recent scholar has argued that the first book should be dated to 100 or 101. Juvenal's works are contemporary with those of Martial, Tacitus and Pliny the Younger.

Manuscript tradition
The controversies concerning the surviving texts of the Satires have been extensive and heated. Many manuscripts survive, but only P (the Codex Pithoeanus Montepessulanus), a 9th-century manuscript based on an edition prepared in the 4th century by a pupil of Servius Honoratus, the grammarian, is reasonably reliable. At the same time as the Servian text was produced, however, other and lesser scholars also created their editions of Juvenal: it is these on which most medieval manuscripts of Juvenal are based. It did not help matters that P disappeared sometime during the Renaissance and was only rediscovered around 1840. It is not, however, uncommon for the generally inferior manuscripts to supply a better reading in cases when P is imperfect. In addition, modern scholarly debate has also raged around the authenticity of the text which has survived, as various editors have argued that considerable portions are not, in fact, authentically Juvenalian and represent interpolations from early editors of the text. Jachmann (1943) argued that up to one-third of what survives is non-authentic: Ulrick Knoche (1950) deleted about hundred lines, Clausen about forty, Courtney (1975) a similar number. Willis (1997) italicizes 297 lines as being potentially suspect. On the other hand, Vahlen, Housman, Duff, Griffith, Ferguson and Green believe the surviving text to be largely authentic: indeed Green regards the main problem as being not interpolations but lacunae.

In recent times debate has focused on the authenticity of the "O Passage" of Satire VI, 36 lines (34 of which are continuous) discovered by E. O. Winstedt in an 11th-century manuscript in Oxford's Bodleian Library. These lines occur in no other manuscript of Juvenal, and when discovered were considerably corrupted. Ever since Housman translated and emended the "O Passage" there has been considerable controversy over whether the fragment is in fact a forgery: the field is currently split between those (Green, Ferguson, Courtney) who believe it is not, and those (Willis, Anderson), who believe it is.

Synopsis of the Satires

Book I

Satire I: It is Hard not to Write Satire

This so-called "Programmatic Satire" lays out for the reader a catalogue of ills and annoyances that prompt the narrator to write satire. Some examples cited by Juvenal include eunuchs getting married, elite women performing in a beast hunt, and the dregs of society suddenly becoming wealthy by gross acts of sycophancy. To the extent that it is programmatic, this satire concerns the first book rather than the satires of the other four known books. The narrator explicitly marks the writings of Lucilius as the model for his book of poems (lines 19–20), although he claims that to attack the living as his model did incur great risk (lines 165–167). The narrator contends that traditional Roman virtues, such as fides and virtus, had disappeared from society, to the extent that "Rome was no longer Roman":

lines 1.1–19 – Since there are so many poets wasting paper and everyone's time anyway – why not write?
lines 1.20–80 – The narrator recites a catalogue of social deviants and criminals that demand Satire be written.
lines 1.81–126 – Since the dawn of history, greed and fiscal corruption have never been worse.
lines 1.127–146 – The narrator contrasts a typical day in the life of poor clients with that of their self-indulgent patron.
lines 1.147–171 – The past cannot be worse than the present – yet one should only satirize the dead if they wish to live in safety.

Satire II: Hypocrites are Intolerable

170 lines. The narrator claims to want to flee civilization (i.e. Roma) to beyond the world's end when confronted by moral hypocrisy. Although the broad theme of this poem is the process of gender inversion, it would be an error to take it as simple invective against pathic men. Juvenal is concerned with gender deviance.

lines 2.1–35 – Pathic men that pretend to be moral exemplars are much worse than those who are open about their proclivities.
lines 2.36–65 – When criticized for her morals, Laronia turns on one of these hypocrites and mocks their open effeminacy.
lines 2.65–81 – Criticism of the effeminate dress of Creticus as he practices law. This moral plague (contagiō) spreads like disease passes through an entire herd of livestock or a bunch of grapes.
lines 2.82–116 – Effeminate dress is the gateway to complete gender inversion.
lines 2.117–148 – A noble man, Gracchus, marries another man – but such brides are infertile no matter what drugs they try or how much they are whipped in the Lupercalia.
lines 2.149–170 – The ghosts of great Romans of the past would feel themselves contaminated when such Romans descend to the underworld.

Satire III: There is no Room in Rome for a Roman

322 lines. In the place where Numa Pompilius (the legendary second king of Rome) received a nymph's advice on creating Roman law, the narrator has a final conversation with his Roman friend Umbricius, who is emigrating to Cumae. Umbricius claims that slick and immoral foreigners have shut a real Roman out of all opportunity to prosper. Only the first 20 lines are in the voice of the narrator; the remainder of the poem is cast as the words of Umbricius.

In 1738, Samuel Johnson was inspired by this text to write his London: A Poem in Imitation of the Third Satire of Juvenal. The archetypal question of whether an urban life of hectic ambition is to be preferred to a pastoral fantasy retreat to the country is posed by the narrator:

lines 3.1–20 – The narrator's old friend Umbricius is about to depart Roma for Cumae. The narrator says he would himself prefer Prochyta to the Suburra, and he describes the ancient shrine of Egeria being put up for rent to Jews and polluted by marble.
lines 3.21–57 – Umbricius: There is no opportunity in Roma for an honest man.
lines 3.58–125 – Umbricius: The Greeks and their ways are flowing like pollution into Roma, and they are so adept at lying flattery that they are achieving more social advancement than real Romans.
lines 3.126–163 – Umbricius: The dregs of society so long as they are wealthy lord it over real Romans; there is no hope for an honest man in court if he is poor.
lines 3.164–189 – Umbricius: Virtue and lack of pretension is only to be found outside the City; at Roma everything is expensive, pretentious, and bought on credit.
lines 3.190–231 – Umbricius contrasts the perils and degradation of living in Roma with the easy and cheap life outside the City.
lines 3.232–267 – Umbricius: The streets of Roma are annoying and dangerous if you are not rich enough to ride in a litter.
lines 3.268–314 – Umbricius: Travel by night in Roma is fraught with danger from falling tiles, thugs, and robbers.
lines 3.315–322 – Umbricius takes his leave of the narrator, and promises to visit him in his native Aquinum.

Satire IV: The Emperor's Fish

154 lines. The narrator makes the emperor Domitian and his court the objects of his ridicule in this mock-epic tale of a fish so prodigious that it was fit for the emperor alone. The council of state is called to deal with the crisis of how to cook it, where the fish can neither be cooked by conventional means due to its size, nor can it be cut into pieces. The main themes of this poem are the corruption and incompetence of sycophantic courtiers and the inability or unwillingness to speak truth to power.

Jean-Jacques Rousseau's motto, vitam impendere vero (to pay his life for the truth), is taken from the passage below, a description of the qualifications of an imperial courtier in the reign of Domitian:

lines 4.1–10 – Criticism of the courtier Crispinus.
lines 4.11–33 – Crispinus bought a mullet for six thousand sesterces – more expensive than the fisherman that caught him.
lines 4.34–56 – Mock-epic narrative of the crisis of state caused by a giant turbot begins with the catch.
lines 4.56–72 – The fisherman rushes to get the fish to the emperor.
lines 4.72–93 – Crispinus and other councilors begin to arrive.
lines 4.94–143 – More councilors arrive and one prophesizes that the fish is an omen of a future victory. The question of what to do with it is raised, and Montanus advises that a vessel be manufactured at once suitable for its size.
lines 4.144–154 – The council break up, and the narrator voices his wish that all the actions of Domitian had been so meaningless.

Satire V: Patronizing Patronage

173 lines. The narrative frame of this poem is a dinner party where many potential dysfunctions in the ideal of the patron-client relationship are put on display. Rather than being a performance of faux-equality, the patron (Virro as in 9.35) emphasizes the superiority of himself and his peers over his clients by offering food and drink of unequal quality to each. Juvenal concludes with the observation that the clients who put up with this treatment deserve it.

lines 5.1–11 – Begging is better than being treated disrespectfully at a patron's dinner.
lines 5.12–23 – An invitation to dinner is a social exchange for your services as a client.
lines 5.24–48 – Different wines and goblets for different social ranks.
lines 5.49–106 – Different water is served by different grades of slaves – and different breads served by arrogant slaves. The patron gets a lobster, and you get a crayfish; he gets a Corsican mullet, and you get a sewer-fish.
lines 5.107–113 – Seneca and others were known for their generosity. The elite should dine as equals with their friends – clients.
lines 5.114–124 – The patron gets a goose liver and boar meat, but you get to watch the meat carver perform.
lines 5.125–155 – If you had a fortune the patron would respect you; it is the cash that he really respects. Different mushrooms and apples.
lines 5.156–173 – Clients who will not resist this kind of treatment deserve it and worse.

Book II

Satire VI: The Decay of Feminine Virtue

c. 695 lines. For the discussion and synopsis, see Satire VI.

Book III

Satire VII: Fortuna (or the Emperor) is the Best Patron

243 lines. Juvenal returns to his theme of distorted economic values among the Roman elite – in this instance centered on their unwillingness to provide appropriate support for poets, lawyers, and teachers. It is the capricious whims of fate that determine the variables of a human life.

lines 7.1–21 – The emperor is the only remaining patron of letters.
lines 7.22–35 – Other patrons have learned to offer their admiration only.
lines 7.36–52 – The urge to write is an addictive disease.
lines 7.53–97 – Money and leisure are required to be a really great poet; hunger and discomfort would have hobbled even Virgil.
lines 7.98–105 – Historians do not have it any better.
lines 7.106–149 – Lawyers get only as much respect as the quality of their dress can buy.
lines 7.150–177 – No one is willing to pay teachers of rhetoric (magistri) appropriately.
lines 7.178–214 – Rich men restrain only their spending on a teacher of rhetoric for their sons.  Quintilian was rich, he was the lucky exception to the rule.
lines 7.215–243 – The qualifications and efforts required of a teacher are totally out of proportion to their pay.

Satire VIII: True Nobility

275 lines. The narrator takes issue with the idea that pedigree ought to be taken as evidence of a person's worth.

lines 8.1–38 – What is the value of a pedigree, if you are inferior to your ancestors?
lines 8.39–55 – Many nobles have done nothing to make themselves noble.
lines 8.56–70 – Racehorses are valued for their speed not their ancestors; if they are slow they will end up pulling a cart.
lines 8.71–86 – It is vile to rely on the reputations of others; one should be noble even in the face of danger.
lines 8.87–126 – Govern your province honestly. When everything else is stolen from those you rule, weapons and desperation remain.
lines 8.127–162 – If you live wickedly, your good ancestors are a reproach to you.
lines 8.163–182 – Bad behavior should be ceased in youth. The nobles make excuses for behavior that would not be tolerated in slaves.
lines 8.183–210 – When they bankrupt themselves, the nobles may sink to the level of the stage or the arena.
lines 8.211–230 – The emperor Nero utterly debased himself in these ways.
lines 8.231–275 – Many people without famous ancestors have served Rome with great distinction. Indeed, everyone is descended from peasants or worse if you go back far enough.

Satire IX: Flattering your Patron is Hard Work

150 lines. This satire is in the form of a dialogue between the narrator and Naevolus – a male prostitute, the disgruntled client of a pathic patron.

lines 9.1–26 – Narrator: Why do you look so haggard, Naevolus?
lines 9.27–46 – Naevolus: The life of serving the needs of pathic rich men is not paying off.
lines 9.46–47 – Nar: But you used to think you were really sexy to men.
lines 9.48–69 – Nae: Rich pathics are not willing to spend on their sickness, but I have bills to pay.
lines 9.70–90 – Nae: I saved his marriage by doing his job for him with a wife that was about to get a divorce.
lines 9.90–91 – Nar: You are justified in complaining, Naevolus. What did he say?
lines 9.92–101 – Nae: He is looking for another two-legged donkey, but don't repeat any of this, he might try to kill me.
lines 9.102–123 – Nar: Rich men have no secrets.
lines 9.124–129 – Nae: But what should I do now; youth is fleeting.
lines 9.130–134 – Nar: You will never lack a pathic patron, don't worry.
lines 9.134–150 – Nae: But I want so little. Fortuna must have her ears plugged when I pray.

Book IV

Satire X: Wrong Desire is the Source of Suffering

366 lines. The theme of this poem encompasses the myriad objects of prayer unwisely sought from the gods: wealth, power, beauty, children, long life, et cetera. The narrator argues that each of these is a false Good; each desired thing is shown to be not good in itself, but only good so long as other factors do not intervene. This satire is the source of the well-known phrase  (a healthy mind in a healthy body), which appears in the passage above. It is also the source of the phrase  (bread and circuses) – the only remaining cares of a Roman populace which has given up its birthright of political freedom (10.81).

lines 10.1–27 – Few know what is really Good. Wealth often destroys.
lines 10.28–55 – One can either cry like Heraclitus or laugh like Democritus at the state of things. But what should men pray for?
lines 10.56–89 – It is all too easy to fall from power – like Sejanus. The mob follows Fortuna and cares for nothing but bread and circuses.
lines 10.90–113 – By seeking ever more honors and power, Sejanus just made his eventual fall that much more terrible.
lines 10.114–132 – Being a great orator like Demosthenes or Cicero may get one killed.
lines 10.133–146 – Lust for military glory has ruined countries, and time will destroy even the graves of famous generals.
lines 10.147–167 – What did Hannibal ultimately accomplish?  He dies of poison in exile.
lines 10.168–187 – The world was not big enough for Alexander the Great, but a coffin was. Xerxes I crawled back to Persia after his misadventure in Greece.
lines 10.188–209 – Long life just means ugliness, helplessness, impotence, and the loss of all pleasure.
lines 10.209–239 – Old people are deaf and full of diseases. Dementia is the worst affliction of all.
lines 10.240–272 – Old people just live to see the funerals of their children and loved ones, like Nestor or Priam.
lines 10.273–288 – Many men would have been thought fortunate if they had died before a late disaster overtook them: e.g. Croesus, Marius, and Pompey.
lines 10.289–309 – Beauty is inimical to a person's virtue. Even if they remain untouched by corruption, it makes them objects of lust for perverts.
lines 10.310–345 – Beautiful men tend to become noted adulterers, risking their lives. Even if they are unwilling like Hippolytus, the wrath of scorned women may destroy them.
lines 10.346–366—Is there nothing to pray for then? Trust the gods to choose what is best; they love humans more than we do ourselves, but if you must pray for something, "[i]t is to be prayed that the mind be sound in a sound body..." (the excerpt above).

Satire XI: Dinner and a Moral

208 lines. The main themes of this poem are self-awareness and moderation. The poem explicitly mentions one apothegm  (know thyself) from the temple of Apollo at Delphi, while its theme calls to mind another  (nothing in excess). The narrator contrasts the ruinous spending habits of gourmands with the moderation of a simple meal of home-grown foods in the manner of the mythical ancient Romans.

lines 11.1–55 – People that refuse to limit their gourmet habits, even in the face of having to do so on credit, soon endure poverty and consequently inferior food. The advice of Apollo to know oneself should be heeded – not just for ambitions and endeavors, but also for what should be spent on a fish.
lines 11.56–89 – The narrator invites a Persicus to come to his house for dinner to see whether his actions match his rhetoric. The dinner will include only home-grown foods from the narrator's Tiburtine land. Long ago, the noble Curius cooked things for himself that a slave on a chain-gang would reject now.
lines 11.90–119 – The ancient Romans did not care for luxuries and Greek art. A Jupiter made of terracotta saved the city from the Gauls.
lines 11.120–135 – Now rich people get no enjoyment from delicacies unless they eat from tables decorated with ivory. The narrator claims that his food is unharmed, despite owning no ivory.
lines 11.136–161 – The narrator promises no professional meat carver or exotic slave servers, nor are his slave boys destined for emasculation and use as sexual toys.
lines 11.162–182 – In place of a pornographic Spanish dance show, there will be poetry.
lines 11.183–208 – Rather than endure the annoyance of all Roma at the Circus Maximus during the Megalensian Games, the narrator invites his addressee to shake off his cares and come to a simple dinner.

Satire XII: True Friendship

130 lines. The narrator describes to his addressee Corvinus the sacrificial vows that he has made for the salvation of his friend Catullus from shipwreck. These vows are to the primary Roman gods – Jupiter, Juno, and Minerva (the Capitoline Triad) – but other shipwrecked sailors are said to make offerings to Isis. In the passage quoted above, the narrator asserts that his sacrifices are not to curry favor or gain an inheritance, common reasons for making vows among those who would not hesitate to sacrifice their slaves or even children if it would bring them an inheritance.

lines 12.1–29 – Description of the sacrificial preparations.
lines 12.30–51 – Description of a storm: this friend had been willing to cast overboard items of great value to save his own life – who else would prefer his life to his treasures.
lines 12.52–82 – They had to cut the mast due to the ferocity of the storm, but then the weather calmed and they limped their ship into the port at Ostia.
lines 12.83–92 – The narrator orders that the altar and sacrifice be made ready. He says that he will propitiate his Lares (family gods) as well.
lines 12.93–130 – Catullus has heirs, so the narrator is acting as a friend not a legacy-hunter. Legacy hunters would sacrifice one hundred cattle, elephants, slaves, or even their own child if it secured an inheritance for them.

Book V (incomplete)

Satire XIII: Don’t Obsess over Liars and Crooks

249 lines. This poem is a dissuasion from excessive rage and the desire for revenge when one is defrauded. The narrator recommends a philosophical moderation and the perspective that comes from realizing that there are many things worse than financial loss.

lines 13.1–18 – Guilt is its own punishment. One should not overreact to ill-use.
lines 13.19–70 – Philosophy and life-experience offer a defense against Fortuna. There are hardly as many good people as the gates of Egyptian Thebes (100) or even as the mouths of the Nile (9). The Golden Age was infinitely superior to the present age, an age so corrupt there is not even an appropriate metal to name it.
lines 13.71–85 – Perjurers will swear on the arms of all the gods to deny their debts.
lines 13.86–119 – Some believe that everything is a product of chance, and so do not fear to perjure themselves on the altars of the gods. Others rationalize that the wrath of the gods, though great, is very slow in coming.
lines 13.120–134 – It takes no philosopher to realize that there are many worse wrongs than being defrauded. A financial loss is mourned more than a death, and it is mourned with real tears.
lines 13.135–173 – It is silly to be surprised by the number and magnitude of the crimes put to trial at Rome, as silly as to be surprised by a German having blue eyes.
lines 13.174–209 – Even execution of a criminal would not undo their crime; only the uneducated think that revenge is a Good. That is not what the philosophers Chrysippos, Thales, or Socrates would say. The narrator makes an extended reference to the story of a corrupt Spartan's consultation of the Oracle of Apollo at Delphi from Herodotus (6.86). The mere intention to do evil is guilt.
lines 13.210–249 – Consciousness of one's guilt is its own punishment, with anxiety and fear of divine retribution. Thus, criminals tend to repeat their crimes, and eventually end up facing execution or exile.

Satire XIV: Avarice is not a Family Value

331 lines. The narrator stresses that children most readily learn all forms of vice from their parents. Avarice must actually be taught since it runs counter to nature. This vice is particularly pernicious, since it has the appearance of a virtue and is the source of a myriad of crimes and cruelties.

lines 14.1–37 – The greatest danger to the morals of children comes from the vices of their parents.
lines 14.38–58 – People should restrain themselves from vice for the sake of their children. It is unjust for a father to criticize and punish a son who takes after himself.
lines 14.59–85 – People are more concerned to present a clean atrium to outsiders than to keep their house free of vice for their children. The tastes acquired in childhood persist into adulthood.
lines 14.86–95 – Caetronius squandered much of his wealth by building many fine houses; his son squandered the rest by doing the same.
lines 14.96–106 – People learn to be Jewish from their parents.
lines 14.107–134 – Avarice has the appearance of a virtue, but it leads to cruel deprivation of one's slaves and one's own self.
lines 14.135–188 – It is madness to live like an indigent just to die rich. There is no amount of money or land that will satisfy greed, but ancient Romans veterans of the Punic wars or of the war against Pyrrhus were content with only two  (acres) of land in return for all their wounds. Impatient greed leads to crime.
lines 14.189–209 – Become a lawyer, join the army, or become a merchant. Profit smells good, wherever it is from. Nobody inquires into where you got it, but you have to have it.
lines 14.210–255 – The greedy son will surpass his father as much as Achilles did Peleus. Instilling avarice is the same as teaching a child every form of crime. A son whom you have taught to have no mercy will have no mercy on you either.
lines 14.256–283 – Those who take risks to increase their fortunes are like tightrope walkers. Fleets sail wherever there is hope of profit.
lines 14.284–302 – Avaricious men are willing to risk their lives and fortunes just to have a few more pieces of silver with someone's face and inscription on them.
lines 14.303–316 – The anxiety of protecting wealth and possessions is a misery. Alexander the Great realized that the cynic Diogenes was happier than himself while living in his pottery home, since Alexander's anxieties and dangers matched his ambitions, while Diogenes was content with what he had and could easily replace.
lines 14.316–331 – How much is enough then?  As much as Epicurus or Socrates was content to possess is best, or – in the Roman manner – a fortune equal to the equestrian order. If twice or three times that does not suffice, then not even the wealth of Croesus or of Persia will suffice.

Satire XV: People without Compassion are Worse than Animals

174 lines. The narrator discusses the centrality of compassion for other people to the preservation of civilization. While severe circumstances have at times called for desperate measures to preserve life, even the most savage tribes have refrained from cannibalism. We were given minds to allow us to live together in mutual assistance and security. Without limits on rage against our enemies, we are worse than animals.

lines 15.1–26 – In Egypt they worship bizarre animal-headed gods, but not the familiar Roman ones. Similarly, they will not eat normal things, but do practice cannibalism.  Ulysses must have been thought a liar for his tale of the Laestrygonians or the Cyclopes.
lines 15.27–32 – Recently in upper Egypt, an entire people was guilty of this crime.
lines 15.33–92 – Two neighboring cities hated each other. One attacked while the other held a feast. Fists gave way to stones and then to arrows; as one side fled, one man slipped and was caught. He was ripped to pieces and eaten raw.
lines 15.93–131 – The Vascones, however, were blameless, because they were compelled to cannibalism by the siege of Pompey the Great. Even at the altar of Artemis in Taurus, humans are only sacrificed, not eaten.
lines 15.131–158 – Compassion is what separates humans from animals. The creator gave humans mind as well as life, so that people could live together in a civil society.

Satire XVI: Soldiers are above the Law

60 lines preserved. The primary theme of the preserved lines is the advantages of soldiers over mere citizens.

lines 16.1–6 – The narrator wishes that he could join the legions, since soldiers have many advantages over civilians.
lines 16.7–34 – Soldiers are immune to justice since they have to be tried in the camp among other soldiers, where a plaintiff will get no help prosecuting them, and may get a beating in addition for their trouble.
lines 16.35–50 – Soldiers do not have to wait for legal action like civilians
lines 16.51–60 – Only soldiers have the right to make a will while their father lives – leading to an inversion of power with the soldier son being above his father.

Notes

References

Anderson, William S.. 1982. Essays on Roman Satire. Princeton: Princeton University Press.
Adams, J. N.. 1982. The Latin Sexual Vocabulary. Baltimore: Johns Hopkins University Press.
Braund, Susanna M.. 1988. Beyond Anger: A Study of Juvenal's Third Book of Satires. Cambridge: Press Syndicate of the University of Cambridge.
Braund, Susanna. 1996. Juvenal Satires Book I. Cambridge: Press Syndicate of the University of Cambridge.
Braund, Susanna. 1996. The Roman Satirists and their Masks. London: Bristol Classical Press.
Courtney, E.. 1980. A Commentary of the Satires of Juvenal. London: Athlone Press.
Edwards, Catherine. 1993. The Politics of Immorality in Ancient Rome. Cambridge: Cambridge University Press.
Edwards, Catherine. 1996. Writing Rome: Textual Approached to the City. Cambridge: Cambridge University Press.
Freudenburg, Kirk. 1993. The Walking Muse: Horace on the Theory of Satire. Princeton: Princeton University Press.
Gleason, Maud. W. 1995. Making Men: Sophists and Self-Presentation in Ancient Rome. Princeton: Princeton University Press.
Gowers, Emily. 1993. The Loaded Table: Representations of Food in Roman Literature. Oxford: Oxford University Press.
Highet, Gilbert. 1961. Juvenal the Satirist. New York: Oxford University Press.
Hutchinson, G. O.. 1993. Latin Literature from Seneca to Juvenal. Oxford: Oxford University Press.
Juvenal. 1992. The Satires. Trans. Niall Rudd. Oxford: Oxford University Press.
Juvenal. 1992. Persi et Juvenalis Saturae. ed. W. V. Clausen. London: Oxford University Press.
The Oxford Classical Dictionary. 1996. 3rd ed. New York: Oxford University Press.
Richlin, Amy. 1992. The Garden of Priapus. New York: Oxford University Press.
Rudd, Niall. 1982. Themes in Roman Satire. Los Angeles: University of California Press.
Syme, Ronald. 1939. The Roman Revolution. Oxford: Oxford University Press.
Uden, James. 2015. The Invisible Satirist: Juvenal and Second-Century Rome. Oxford: Oxford University Press. 
Walters, Jonathan. 1997. Invading the Roman Body: Manliness and Impenetrability in Roman Thought. in J. Hallet and M. Skinner, eds., Roman Sexualities, Princeton: Princeton University Press.
Juvenal. 1998. The Sixteen Satires. Trans. Peter Green. London: Penguin Books.

External links

 Juvenal's 16 "Satires" in Latin, at The Latin Library
 Juvenal's Satires 1, 2, and 3 in Latin and English (translation G. G. Ramsay) at the Internet Ancient History Sourcebook
 Juvenal's Satire 3 in Latin and English, at Vroma
 Juvenal's Satires 1, 10, and 16, English translation by Lamberto Bozzi (2016-2017)
 Juvenal's Satires in English verse, through Google Books
 The Satires of Juvenal, Persius, Sulpicia, and Lucilius in English prose, through Google Books
 Commentary on the Satires by Edward Courtney

Works by Juvenal
Satirical poems
2nd-century Latin books